Matteo Sonza Reorda is an electrical engineer at the Politecnico di Torino, Italy. He was named a Fellow of the Institute of Electrical and Electronics Engineers (IEEE) in 2016 for his design of test algorithms for reliable circuits and systems. Actually he is the head of CAD - Electronic CAD & Reliabillity Group at Politecnico di Torino. He teaches Computer architectures.

References 

Fellow Members of the IEEE
Living people
Engineers from Turin
Year of birth missing (living people)
Academic staff of the Polytechnic University of Turin